Mordacia praecox, the Australian brook lamprey or nonparasitic lamprey, is a freshwater species of southern topeyed lamprey that occurs in south-eastern Australia. It has a thin eel-like body around 12 to 15 cm long, with two low dorsal fins on the back half. The skin is dark blue above and gray below.  Its eyes are small, and located on the top of its head. Unlike M. mordax, M. praecox's eyes appear to have the potential for dichromatic vision (despite being similarly adapted for low-light environments).

M. praecox is known only from the Moruya and Tuross Rivers in southern New South Wales. Unlike most other species of lampreys, it spends its entire life in fresh water. The ammocoetes (lamprey larvae) take around three years to reach maturity. Ammocoetes and juvenile adults are indistinguishable from those of M. mordax, which also occurs within its distribution, but the adults are easily distinguished by their size and colouration.

References
 
 
 Warrington, Rachael (2016). Retinal photoreception in southern hemisphere lampreys (PhD). University of Western Australia.
 

praecox
Freshwater fish of Australia
Vulnerable fauna of Australia